Werner Coetsee (born 16 March 1983) is a South African first-class cricketer. He was included in the Griqualand West cricket team squad for the 2015 Africa T20 Cup. In August 2017, he was named in Bloem City Blazers' squad for the first season of the T20 Global League. However, in October 2017, Cricket South Africa initially postponed the tournament until November 2018, with it being cancelled soon after.

References

External links
 

1983 births
Living people
South African cricketers
Griqualand West cricketers
Northern Cape cricketers
People from Dihlabeng Local Municipality
Netherlands cricketers
Cricketers from Free State (province)